Huerta Real is a village located in the Benamaurel municipality, province of Granada, Spain. According to the 2011 census (INE), the city has a population of 120 inhabitants.

It is located by the Guardal River, where Baza and Cúllar rivers join it. Most inhabitants live in cave houses.

References 

Populated places in the Province of Granada